Ecsenius fourmanoiri, the blackstriped combtooth blenny,  is a species of combtooth blenny in the genus Ecsenius. It is found in the western Pacific ocean. It can reach a maximum length of 4.9 centimetres. Blennies in this species feed primarily off of benthic algae and weeds. The specific name honours the French ichthyologist Pierre Fourmanoir (1924-2007), who collected the first specimens of this species and realised that it had not been described.

References

fourmanoiri
Fish described in 1972
Taxa named by Victor G. Springer